Media Dreams was an Indian film production and distribution company formed in 1997. It produced several Tamil language films in the early 2000s, and was later acquired by Pentamedia Graphics.

History 
Media Dreams was set up in 1997 as an Indian entertainment business unit catering to the television, theatre and the internet. It was acquired by Pentamedia Graphics in December 2000. The group's key partners included prominent writer Sujatha as its managing director.

The studio's first feature film Bharathi, a biopic of poet Subramania Bharati, opened to critical and commercial acclaim, prompting the producers to take on several more projects in the early 2000s. Other notable films that the group made during the period included Cheran's family drama Pandavar Bhoomi (2001), Singeetam Srinivasa Rao's multilingual fantasy film Little John (2001) and Moulee's comedy drama Pammal K. Sambandam (2002) starring Kamal Haasan. The group also subsequently moved onto distribute films, make television serials such as Balu Mahendra's Kadhai Neram, and release audio albums.

In early 2001, Media Dreams announced that they would produce Robo, a science fiction film by Shankar, starring Kamal Haasan and Preity Zinta. However, the film was later stalled due to escalating costs. The team had also announced that they would produce the film version of Sundara Ramaswamy's novel Oru Puliyamarathin Kathai, which would mark the directorial debut of art director P. Krishnamoorthy, but the project eventually did not materialise. The commercial failure of some of its films forced the group to stop making films, with its final release Whistle (2003), having a delayed release.

Filmography 
Films as producer

Films as distributor
In addition to the films produced by Media Dreams, the following films from other banners were distributed by the company.

12B (2001)
Samrat Ashoka (2001; dubbed)

Television
 Balu Mahendra Kathai Neram
 Ladies Club – "Senior / Junior"
 Southern Spice
 Neelavaanam
 Thozhigal
 Thanthira Bhoomi
 Ambighai

References 

Film distributors of India
Film production companies based in Chennai
Indian film studios
1997 establishments in Tamil Nadu
Indian companies established in 1997
Mass media companies established in 1997